Ifrane (Berber: ⵉⴼⵔⴰⵏ) is a city in the Middle Atlas region of northern Morocco (population 14,659 as of November 2014). In the regional Tamazight language, "ifran" means caves.

The modern town of Ifrane was established by the French administration in 1928 during the protectorate era for their administration due to its Alpine climate. Ifrane was conceived as a "hill station" or colonial type of settlement. It is a resort town set high up in the mountains so that Europeans could find relief from the summer heat of the interior plains of Morocco. Ifrane is also a popular altitude training destination.

The first permanent settlement of the area dates to the 16th century, when the Sharif of Sîdî 'Abd al-Salâm established his community in the Tizguit Valley, seven km downstream from the present town. Ifrane is a colonial "hill station", and a "garden city". It is also an "imperial city", a mountain resort, a provincial administrative center, and a college town.

History

The first permanent settlement of the area dates to the 16th century, when a sharîf by the name of Sîdî ‘Abd al-Salâm established his community in the Tizguit Valley, seven km downstream from the present town. In the Local Amazigh language, Ifran means "caves". Sîdî ‘Abd al-Salâm’s village, called Zaouiat Sidi Abdeslam (or simply the zâwiyah), consisted at first of cave dwellings hollowed out of the limestone valley wall. Only in the last fifty years or so have its inhabitants built houses aboveground. The caves which
now lie under these houses are still used as mangers for animals and for storage.

By the mid-17th century Sîdî ‘Abd al-Salâm’s zâwiyah was well enough established to
receive an extensive iqtâ’, or land grant, from the ‘Alâwî sultan Mûlây Rashîd b. Muhammad.
The iqtâ’ extended from upstream of present Ifrane down the Tizguit valley all the way to El Hajeb escarpment. Late in the 19th century agro-pastoral groups of the Amazigh Senhadja Beni M’guild and Zenata the Ait Seghrouchen, crossing the Middle Atlas from the upper Moulouya Plain, started grazing their herds of sheep and goats on the surrounding plateau. The livelihood of the zâwiyah was based on irrigated agriculture on the valley floor, livestock grazing and forest resources.

The agricultural plots were held as private property (mulk) but the grazing land was under collective tribal jurisdiction (j’maa). The tribally organized populations of the Ifrane-Azrou area submitted to colonial rule after a period of resistance (1913–1917). Resistance continued higher in the mountains (Timahdit, Jebel Fazzaz) until 1922.

Modern history

The modern town of Ifrane was established by the French administration in 1929 on land expropriated from the inhabitants of the zâwiya. The town was to be a "hill station", a cool place for colonial families to spend the hot summer months, and it was initially planned according to the "garden city" model of urban design then in vogue. The plan called for chalet-type summer homes in the Alpine style, laid out among gardens and curving tree-lined streets. A royal palace was also built for Sultan Muhammad b. Yûsuf. The town's first public buildings consisted of a post office and a church. Moreover, a penitentiary was built which served as a POW camp during World War II.

As elsewhere in Morocco, a shanty town called Timdiqîn soon grew up next to the colonial establishment. It housed the Moroccan population (maids, gardeners, etc.) that serviced the French vacationers. Timdiqîn was separated from the colonial garden city by a deep ravine. After independence, the French properties in the original garden city were slowly bought up by Moroccans. The town was enlarged and endowed with a mosque, a municipal market and public housing estates. Furthermore, the shanty neighborhood of Timdiqîn was rebuilt with proper civic amenities.

In 1979 Ifrane became the seat of the administrative province of the same name and some government services were established. In 1995 Al Akhawayn University, an English-language, American-curriculum public university opened and this has helped re-launch Ifrane as a desirable destination for domestic tourism. Consequently, Ifrane continues to develop as both a summer and winter resort. Old chalets in the center of town are being demolished and replaced with condominium complexes, while vacation centers and gated housing estates are springing up on the outskirts.

The Middle Atlas Mountains consist mostly of a series of limestone plateaux. Not far from Ifrane in the Middle Atlas is Cèdre Gouraud Forest. These plateaux receive considerable precipitation—averaging about 1,100/1,200 ml/year in Ifrane—and are naturally wooded, with scrub oak forests alternating with cedar. The Middle Atlas lies in the center of Morocco and constitutes its natural water tower, as many of the country's most important
river systems: the Moulouya, the Sebou, the Bou Regreg, and the Oum Rabia originate in it. Historically, however, despite its centrality, the Middle Atlas has been an "empty quarter".
Though the area was regularly crossed by traders, and though the alpine summer pasture
was used by herders, the harsh climate and  relatively poor soils long impeded permanent
human settlement. Today the Middle Atlas is still one of the least densely populated parts
of Morocco, even when compared to other mountainous regions such as the High Atlas and the Rif.

A small fort overlooking Oued Tizguit (now part of the palace precinct) had already been built during the period of military conquest in order to secure the Fez to Khenifra road across the mountains. The gently rolling landscape, with fresh springs and wildflowers, was judged to have potential as a summer resort for colon families from the Saïss Plain, Meknes and Fez. Fifty hectares of agricultural land upstream from the zâwiyah, in an area originally designated as Tourthit, or "garden", was expropriated for the project.

Ifrane was conceived as a "hill station" or colonial type of settlement. It is a resort town set high up in the mountains so that Europeans can find relief from the summer heat of tropical colonies. The British were the first to develop this type of resort in
India, the best known of which is Simla in the Himalayas which served as their "summer capital". The French built similar hill stations in Indochina, such as Da Lat, established in 1921.
Ifrane was not the only hill station to be built in Morocco. The French also built one in neighboring Imouzzer Marmoucha, as well as at Oukaïmeden in the High Atlas. Hill stations share some common characteristics. As they are intended for expatriate European families, and they are often designed in such a way as to remind their foreign inhabitants of
their distant homelands. The architectural style adopted is imported from the mother country in order that the place look like "Little England" or "douce France". This is the case in Ifrane where various mountain styles such as "maison basque" "Jura" and "Savoy" were used. Moreover, trees and flowering plants were also imported from the European home country. This too was intended to heighten the appearance and feeling of home. In Ifrane, lilac trees, plane-trees (platanes), chestnut and horse-chestnut trees (marronniers and châtaigniers) and lime trees (tilleuls) were all imported for this purpose.

"Garden City"

Ifrane was planned according to the "garden city" model of urban design, fashionable in Western Europe between the two world wars. The concept of the garden city was developed in Britain as a model of social reform to solve the problems of 19th century industrial cities. By the 1920s however it had lost its social purpose to become an urban design type. Garden cities required low density housing consisting of fully detached or semi-detached single family homes surrounded by gardens.

In order to break with industrial-era grid plans, garden cities were always laid out with curving tree-lined streets. In fact, most garden cities were affluent suburbs, not true cities in their own right. They catered to the tastes of the upper middle classes who could afford to own a private automobile and property in the suburbs. They gave the illusion of county life, with village-type architecture, curvy streets and many trees, to people who in reality worked in big cities. Ifrane's initial garden city plan was designed in 1928 in Rabat by the Services Techniques of the Bureau de Contrôle des Municipalités, a division of the Direction des Affairs Politiques.

The 1928 plan – for the neighborhood known as Hay Riad today – had typical garden city features: curvy streets named for flora (Rue des lilas, Rue des tilleuls, etc.), and chalet-style houses. Houses could occupy only 40% of plots; the rest had to be planted as a garden. Moreover, large parts of the center of the town consisted of public gardens. Some of the original architecture can still be seen, especially in the neighborhood around the town hall and the Perce Neige Hotel. The summer homes built by the colons were designed by many of the same architects who built the European parts of Casablanca and Rabat. Whereas the European architecture in these big cities was innovative and intentionally modern, Ifrane's houses were built in traditional European styles and resembled those in the suburbs of contemporaneous French cities.

Ifrane's first public buildings were a post office and a Roman Catholic church. The church, consecrated in 1939, was designed by Paul Tournon (1881–1964), a recipient of the prestigious Prix de Rome who had also designed the Sacré Cœur Church in Casablanca. The resort function of the new town was consolidated with the building of a number of hotels. Ifrane's first flagship hotel was the Balima, which was demolished in the 1980s. The other main hotel was the Grand Hôtel, which has recently been refurbished. A royal palace was also built for Sultan Muhammad b.Yûsuf.

Ifrane is thus an "imperial" city in that it houses a palace and benefits from royal patronage. One final institution of Ifrane's early years worthy of mention is the penitentiary which no longer exists, and the site, across from the Police Academy and the new police Commissariat, has been redeveloped as a summer camp for the Ministry of Justice. The penitentiary served as a Prisoner of War camp during World War II. The popular story of the origin of Ifrane's lion sculpture involves an Italian inmate of this prison sculpting the lion out of an outcrop of limestone; however, this is not true as the lion dates from at least 1936 thus predating World War II.

The garden city hill station high in the Middle Atlas was always going to be an illusion of suburban middle-class France. The colonial reality of the place was manifest in two ways. First of all the inhabitants of Zaouiat Sidi Abdeslam, the original owners of the land on which the town was built, were never properly compensated for their loss. Secondly, the town plan was incomplete. Provisions were made for the housing and infrastructure of colonial home-owners, but not for the Moroccan maids, gardeners or guards who worked for them. Finding no housing in the official allotments, these people had to build their own houses some distance away, across a ravine north of the town. As elsewhere in Morocco at the time, a shantytown thus grew up next to the colonial town. This is the origin of Timdiqin (officially called Hay Atlas).

Climate
Located in the Atlas Mountains, and affected by the cold north Atlantic current, Ifrane has a continental-influenced warm-summer Mediterranean climate (Csb) with short, somewhat dry, warm summers and long, cool, damp winters. The nights can be severely cold in winter. The winter highs rarely exceed  in December–February.

Because of its elevation, the town experiences snow during the winter months and a cooler climate during the summer (not as hot as in the nearby regions which lie at a lower altitude).

Owing to the city's elevation and proximity to the north Atlantic Ocean, rainfall is very heavy whenever frontal systems affect the region. Precipitation patterns follow the classic Mediterranean range, from October to April. The city also receives high snowfall starting as early as October and lasting well into spring season. The annual average temperature does not exceed .

Ifrane holds the record for the lowest temperature ever observed in Africa:  on February 11, 1935.

Flora and fauna
Ifrane's biodiversity is unique. Its fauna and flora contain rare yet mostly endangered species. Animals to be found in the vicinity include the threatened Barbary macaque. Among the local tree species are the native Atlas cedar, scrub oak and the introduced London plane.

Fauna

Mammalian species 
 The Barbary macaque (Macaca sylvanus), an endangered monkey species that lives in its wild state in the forests of the Middle Atlas, including the forests surrounding Ifrane. Barbary macaques can be seen in the outskirts or the farther areas of the town of Ifrane when there is no more food in the woods, or simply because they have become familiar with humans.
 The golden jackal (Canis aureus), referred to as ‘ich’ab’ in Tamazight, the same term used for ‘wolf’
 The caracal (Caracal caracal), which is hard to spot, and survives thanks to its extreme discretion.
 The common genet (Genetta genetta)

Bird species 
 The Atlas Coal Tit (Parus ater Atlas), an endemic passerine bird native to the Atlas mountains range.
 The African crimson-winged finch (Rhodopechys alienus)
 The white scavenger vulture (Neophron percnopterus)
Ifrane is also well known for its pisciculture (fish farming) stations. Ras el Ma forest has a trout-breeding station in which trout can be seen in their breeding basins. Moreover, Ifrane has a varied range of insects and amphibians.

Flora 
Ifrane's plant and tree species include the following: 
 The Atlas cedar (Cedrus Atlantica)
 The holm oak (Quercus rotundifolia)
 The Portuguese oak (Quercus faginea)
 The maritime pine (Pinus pinaster ssp. Hamiltoni var. maghrebiana)
 The Spanish juniper (Juniperus thurifera)
 The laurel-leaf cistus (Cistus laurifolius)
 Genista quadrifolia
 Artemisia mesatlantica

Notable people
 Mostafa Smaili, middle-distance runner

Notes

References
 Inventaire de la Biodiversité. (2016). Clearing House Mechanism on Biodiversity of Morocco. Retrieved from http://ma.chm
 Robin Gauldie, Morocco, New Holland Publishers  . 128 pages
 C. Michael Hogan, (2008) Barbary Macaque: Macaca sylvanus, Globaltwitcher.com, ed. Nicklas Stromberg

External links 

 Lexicorient 
 Al Akhawayn University

Populated places in Ifrane Province
Ski areas and resorts in Morocco
Historic Jewish communities in North Africa
Provincial capitals in Morocco